"Chosen One"  is a song by Smog on his Julius Caesar-album. Since its release it has been covered several times, including a version by The Flaming Lips in a Minneapolis record store on December 12, 1993, a recording which later appeared on their EP Due to High Expectations... the Flaming Lips Are Providing Needles for Your Balloons. German indie-pop singer Monta has also covered Chosen One during concerts, but the material remains unreleased.

Later Chosen One was included in a Peel Session which transmitted November 12, 1997. This new version was featured as a b-side on the Cold Blooded Old Times-single as well as on the rarities compilation Accumulation: None.

Bill Callahan (musician) songs
Songs written by Bill Callahan (musician)
1993 songs